is a professional Japanese baseball player who currently pitches for the Hokkaido Nippon-Ham Fighters.

His wife is Japanese announcer Asami Konno.

External links

 NPB.com

1992 births
Living people
Baseball people from Hokkaido
People from Obihiro, Hokkaido
Japanese baseball players
Nippon Professional Baseball pitchers
Tokyo Yakult Swallows players
Hokkaido Nippon-Ham Fighters players